Zapp Electric Vehicles Ltd. is a British electric motorcycle manufacturer. The company was founded in 2017. Zapp unveiled its first electric product, the i300, in 2018, as the only 300cc class electric step through (EU L3e-A2).

Zapp i300 
The i300 is one of the fastest accelerating motorcycles in the market. The i300 is suitable for Europeans with an  A2 Licence, as the top speed is electronically restricted to 96 km/h.

The i300 is highly modular. The website configurator offers  consumers the ability to personalize their own scooter as part of the purchasing experience.

The i300 comes with an air cooled Internal Permanent Magnet Motor (IPM) producing 14 kW of peak power and 587 Nm of torque to the rear wheel.

The i300 provides instant acceleration, propelling the lightweight 90 kg scooter to a speed of 50 km/h in 2.35 seconds and 70 km/h in 4.1 seconds.

The premium mid-mounted motor  provides power via a carbon fiber belt drive, replacing the chain. This gives the i300 better efficiency of power transmission, as well as requiring less maintenance.

The i300 uses a high-strength alloy load-bearing exoskeleton, a first for motorcycles. The frame is chrome-moly steel tubing. Together these create a strong and lightweight platform.

The i300 uses two removable, lightweight (6 kg each), ultra-portable, cell-to-pack configured, Li-NMC, mid-voltage (72V) battery packs. Each battery is rated at 1.25 kWh. They can be used individually or in tandem to create a total energy amount of 2.5 kWh. The batteries can be charged via any universal/domestic 110/220/250V plug-in sockets.

Awards 
Zapp's i300 won the Silver Award at the 2019 European Design Award under the Transportation/Alternative Fuel Vehicles category .

Zapp's i300 won an A' Design Award & Competition award for the 2019-2020 year  under the Vehicle, Mobility and Transportation Design Category.

Zapp's i300 won the Gold Award at the 2020 MUSE Design Awards under the Bicycles / Motorcycles sub-category under the Transportation category.

References 
Footnotes

Sources
 NewAtlas.com - Zapp unveils new i300 electric scooter
 Forbes - Super Electric Scooter Looks To Zapp Urban Mobility Market
 Bloomberg - Startups Look to Electrify Dirty Two-Wheelers
 Electric Motorcycle News - Zapp i300
 Electrive - UK Start-up launching high speed electric scooter
 Bikesure - Zapp Electric Scooter
 Ultimate Motorcycling - Zapp E-Scooter set to launch this month
 Yahoo News - Zapp unveils its new electric scooter
 Plugin Magazine - Zapp i300 is newest addition to the electric scooters market

Electric scooters
2017 establishments in England
Motorcycle manufacturers of the United Kingdom